Lisavy is a rural locality (a village) in Krasnoplamenskoye Rural Settlement, Alexandrovsky District, Vladimir Oblast, Russia. The population was 232 as of 2010. There are 5 streets.

Geography 
Lisavy is located on the Sablya River, 39 km northwest of Alexandrov (the district's administrative centre) by road. Otertikovo is the nearest rural locality.

References 

Rural localities in Alexandrovsky District, Vladimir Oblast